Hymenostilbe is a genus of fungi in the Ophiocordycipitaceae family. All members are anamorph names of Ophiocordyceps.

Species
Hymenostilbe ampullifera
Hymenostilbe aphidis
Hymenostilbe aurantiaca
Hymenostilbe australiensis
Hymenostilbe campanoti
Hymenostilbe dipterigena
Hymenostilbe formicarum
Hymenostilbe fragilis
Hymenostilbe furcata
Hymenostilbe ghanensis
Hymenostilbe ichneumonophila
Hymenostilbe kedrovensis
Hymenostilbe kobayasii
Hymenostilbe lecaniicola
Hymenostilbe longispora
Hymenostilbe melanopoda
Hymenostilbe muscaria
Hymenostilbe nutans
Hymenostilbe odonatae
Hymenostilbe sphingum
Hymenostilbe spiculata
Hymenostilbe sulphurea
Hymenostilbe ventricosa
Hymenostilbe verrucosa

References

External links

Sordariomycetes genera
Ophiocordycipitaceae